Rochford railway station is on the Shenfield to Southend Line in the East of England, serving the town of Rochford, Essex. It is  down the line from London Liverpool Street and is situated between Hockley and  stations. The Engineer's Line Reference for the line is SSV; the station's three-letter station code is RFD. The platforms have an operational length for 12-coach trains.

History 
The line from Wickford to Southend and Rochford station were opened on 1 October 1889. There was formerly a signal box at the station, this was decommissioned in 1938 with the introduction of colour light signalling. There was a goods yard on the west side of the station, it was closed on 5 June 1967. Electrification of the Shenfield to Southend Victoria line using 1.5 kV DC overhead line electrification (OLE) was completed on 31 December 1956. This was changed to 6.25 kV AC in November 1960 and to 25 kV AC on 25 January 1979.

Services 
The station is currently managed by Greater Anglia, which also operates all trains serving it. Rochford was formerly the closest railway station to Southend Airport until the airport's own dedicated station opened in 2011.

References

External links

Transport in Rochford District
Railway stations in Essex
DfT Category C2 stations
Former Great Eastern Railway stations
Greater Anglia franchise railway stations
Railway stations in Great Britain opened in 1889